Crow House may refer to:

in the United States
(by state then city)
Childers-Tate-Crow House, in the Summerfield District, Summerfield, Dallas County, Alabama
Habicht-Cohn-Crow House, Arkadelphia, Arkansas
Crow House (Star City, Arkansas)
Oscar Crow House, Star City, Arkansas
Crow–Hightower House, Eads, Colorado
Crowe-Garritt House, Hanover, Indiana
William Crow House, Bryantsville, Kentucky, listed on the National Register of Historic Places (NRHP)
Crow-Barbee House, Danville, Kentucky, listed on the NRHP
Judith Crow House, Cape Girardeau, Missouri
Henry Varnum Poor House, also known as Crow House, New City, New York